The Football League First Division Manager of the Month award was a monthly prize of recognition given to association football managers in the Football League First Division, the second tier of English football from 1992 to 2004. The award was announced in the first week of the following month. From the 2004–05 season onwards, following a rebranding exercise by The Football League, the second tier was known as the Football League Championship, thus the award became the Football League Championship Manager of the Month award.

Winners

2000–01

2001–02

2002–03

2003–04

Later years

Footnotes

References

External links
Manager of the Month at the League Managers Association

English Football League trophies and awards
Manager of the Month